Social Policy (Non-Metropolitan Territories) Convention, 1947 is  an International Labour Organization Convention.

It was established in 1947 with the preamble stating:
Having decided upon the adoption of certain proposals concerning social policy in non-metropolitan territories,...

Ratifications
As of 2013, the convention has been ratified by four states: Belgium, France, New Zealand, and the United Kingdom.

External links 
Text.
Ratifications.

International Labour Organization conventions
Social policy
Treaties concluded in 1947
Treaties entered into force in 1955
Treaties of Belgium
Treaties of France
Treaties of New Zealand
Treaties of the United Kingdom
Treaties extended to Tokelau
1947 in labor relations